Lawn, (population 583 ), is a town located at the tip of the Burin Peninsula on Newfoundland's South coast, Newfoundland and Labrador. Lawn is spread around a small harbour in a relatively lush valley. According to one local tradition it was this lushness that inspired Captain James Cook to name the place Lawn Harbour. But it has also been speculated that a Frenchman named the community after a doe caribou that he spotted there.

Lawn is a community whose survival over the past two hundred years has depended entirely on the fishery. The abundance of fish in the waters surrounding Lawn (formerly known as Laun) attracted seasonal fishermen from France, Portugal, Spain and England. These fishermen came over in large fishing ships and returned to their homelands in the fall. This type of migratory fishery continued to exist on the Burin Peninsula well into the eighteen hundreds. However, in 1763 an important event occurred which had a tremendous impact on the development of permanent settlements on the Burin Peninsula.
The town of Lawn was formed as Community Council in 1952 and was changed to a Town Council in 1968.

History 
One of Newfoundland's first hydroelectric generators was commissioned in Lawn in 1930.

1942 naval disaster 
In the pre-dawn hours of February 18, 1942, three United States Navy ships ran aground on the shore of the Burin Peninsula between Lawn and the nearby community of St. Lawrence.  It was determined that the USS Pollux, USS Truxtun and USS Wilkes made a navigation error while en route to Naval Station Argentia.  Under exceptionally difficult storm and ice conditions eight residents of Lawn assisted in the rescue of survivors. 185 sailors survived and 203 died as a result of the disaster.

Demographics 

See also
 Burin Peninsula
 List of cities and towns in Newfoundland and Labrador

References

Populated coastal places in Canada
Towns in Newfoundland and Labrador
Fishing communities in Canada